Plural Left was a left-wing coalition which governed France from 1997 to 2002.

Plural Left may also refer to:
 Plural Left (Spain, 2011), also known as United Left-The Greens: Plural Left, an electoral coalition formed in 2011 to contest the 2011 Spanish general election
 Plural Left (Spain, 2014), an electoral coalition formed in 2014 to contest the 2014 European Parliament election in Spain

See also
 Pluralist Left